Bozataw district (Karakalpak: Бозатаў районы, Bozataw rayonı) is a district of Karakalpakstan in Uzbekistan. The seat lies at the urban-type settlement Bozataw. It was created in September 2019 from parts of the Kegeyli district and the Shimbay district.

The district contains one town Bozataw and four village councils Aspantay, Erkindarya, Kok-suw and Qusqanataw.

References

Karakalpakstan
Districts of Uzbekistan